Eyemark is also a term used for the CBS network's longtime Eye Device logo.

Perophthalma is a very small butterfly genus in the family Riodinidae. The genus comprises only two species, both found only in Central and South America. They are commonly called eyemarks, alluding to the eyespot on the wings.

Mesosemiini
Riodinidae of South America
Butterfly genera
Taxa named by John O. Westwood